The Rio de Janeiro gubernatorial election was held on 5 October 2014 to elect the next governor of the state of Rio de Janeiro. Since no candidate received more than 50% of the vote, a second-round runoff election was held on the 26th of October.  Incumbent Governor Luiz Fernando Pezão, who was running for his first full term, was forced into the runoff against Marcelo Crivella but ultimately won.

Campaign
On December 2, 2013, Governor Sergio Cabral Filho announced he would be stepping down as Governor on March 31, 2014 in order to pursue an ultimately-unlaunched bid for the Brazilian Senate.  With his election in 2010, Cabral enjoyed high approval ratings until the 2013 protests in Brazil severely damaged his popularity.  Following Cabral's resignation, Vice Governor Luiz Fernando Pezão succeeded him and announced his intent to run in the 2014 election.

Other candidates had launched their candidacies prior to Cabral's resignation: former Governor Anthony Garotinho of the Republic Party in April 2012 and Senator Lindberg Farias of the PT in November 2012.

Runoff endorsements
On October 7, Marcelo Crivella received an endorsement from third place candidate Anthony Garotinho.  He also received endorsements from fourth place finisher Lindberg Farias and the state branch of the Workers Party (PT) in an announcement made by state party president Washington Quaquá.  The PT, however is divided in this decision.  Nine of the ten PT mayors in the state are supporting Pezão, the exception being Quaquá (Mayor of Maricá).  PT supporters of Pezão include Niterói Mayor Rodrigo Neves and State Deputy Carlos Minc.

On October 12, Luiz Fernando Pezão received the endorsement of newly elected Senator Romário, while the state branch of the PSB decided to not endorse either candidate.

Candidates

Governor

Senator

Opinion polling

Results

Governor

Senator

External links
Luiz Fernando Pezão Campaign Website
Anthony Garotinho Campaign Website
Marcelo Crivella Campaign Website
Lindberg Farias Campaign Website

References

October 2014 events in South America
2014 Brazilian gubernatorial elections
Rio de Janeiro gubernatorial elections